The ARY Film Award for Best Actress is one of the ARY Film Awards of Merit presented annually by the ARY Digital Network and Entertainment Channel to female actor working in the film industry. Best Actress is considered to be one of five most important awards of the ARY Film Awards, as it represents the main icon of cinematic industry on which all aspects of film such as directing, acting, music composing, writing, editing and other efforts that put forth into a drama is depending. This award is one of the two Best Actress awards in ceremony, in which one is awarded to relevant film actress only by the decision of ceremony Jury, while other is being awarded on Viewers Voting's.

History

The Best Actress category originates with the 1st ARY Film Awards ceremony since 2014. The Best Actress is awarded by viewers voting and known as Best Actress Viewers Choice but officially it is termed as Best Actress. Since ARY Film Awards has been just started, this category has not a brief history.

Winners and nominees 
For the Best Actress winner which is decided by Viewers, but simply regarded as Best Actress as compared to other Best Actress Award which has superfix of Best Actress Jury. As of the first ceremony, total of five actresses were nominated, any actor who won Jury award can eligible for nomination in Viewers choice awards. This category is among fourteen Viewers Awards.

Date and the award ceremony shows that the 2010 is the period from 2010–20 (decade), while the year above winners and nominees shows that the film year in which they were releases, and the figure in bracket shows the ceremony number, for example; an award ceremony is held for the films of its previous year.

References

External links 

 

ARY Film Award winners
ARY Film Awards
Awards for actresses